Antonio Porcelli (1800–1870) was an Italian painter. He painted both landscape and figures in genre scenes. Some of the paintings have been described as of "historic or fantastic themes" including one titled Il nano misterioso nella spianata di Pietra Nera based on W. Scott story, Pinacoteca Civica of Ravena. He was inscribed in 1838 in the Congregazione dei Virtuosi al Pantheon. Other notes describe his as a painter of bambocciate.

Works

 A peddler
 Joseph with Jesus as a child
 IL BARBIERE, 1835 
 Two octagoanl temperas on parchement with birds and animals on branches of fruit trees, 1657

References

1800 births
1870 deaths
19th-century Italian painters
Italian male painters
Italian genre painters
19th-century Italian male artists